A statue of Christopher Columbus was installed in Waterbury, Connecticut in 1984. It was decapitated in July 2020 amid protests.

Restoration 
The Columbus monument was repaired in December 2020, it cost 8,800 dollars to repair the statue. One person was arrested for the decapitation after he was found trying to sell Columbus's nose online.

See also

 List of monuments and memorials removed during the George Floyd protests

References

Buildings and structures in Waterbury, Connecticut
Monuments and memorials in Connecticut
Monuments and memorials removed during the George Floyd protests
Outdoor sculptures in Connecticut
Sculptures of men in Connecticut
Statues in Connecticut
Waterbury, Connecticut
Vandalized works of art in Connecticut